Bhojpuri is an Indo-Aryan language of India and Nepal.

Bhojpuri may also refer to:

 Bhojpuri people
 Bhojpuri region, where the Bhojpuri language is spoken
 Bhojpuri, Rajasthan, a village in India
 Bhojpuri Music
 Bhojpuri cinema
 Bhojpuri cuisine
 Bhojpuri literature
 Bhojpur (disambiguation)
 Bhojpuri Channel, a TV channel
 

Language and nationality disambiguation pages